Demons of the Mind is a 1972 British horror film, directed by Peter Sykes and produced by Anglo-EMI, Frank Godwin Productions and Hammer Film Productions. It was written by Christopher Wicking, based on a story by Frank Godwin and was released on 5 November 1972. The cast includes Gillian Hills (playing a role originally intended for Marianne Faithfull), Robert Hardy, Patrick Magee, Michael Hordern and Shane Briant.

Plot 
A wealthy widower locks up his two grown-up children, afraid that they will go mad, as did his wife. He then invites a doctor of dubious reputation to supervise their mental health and cure them of the unnatural attraction they have for each other. Meanwhile, in the vicinity of the mansion, murders are happening in the local village and a travelling priest arrives to help drive out any local demons.

Cast 
 Robert Hardy as Zorn
 Shane Briant as Emil
 Gillian Hills as Elizabeth
 Yvonne Mitchell as Hilda
 Paul Jones as Carl Richter
 Patrick Magee as Falkenberg
 Kenneth J. Warren as Klaus
 Michael Hordern as Priest
 Robert Brown as Fischinger
 Virginia Wetherell as Inge
 Deirdre Costello as Magda
 Barry Stanton as Ernst
 Sidonie Bond as Zorn's Wife
 Thomas Heathcote as Coachman
 Sheila Raynor as Old crone

Background 
The film's working title was Blood Will Have Blood.

"Hammer thought there were too many bloods," said Wicking later. "I don't think anybody knew it was a quote from Shakespeare because they would have said no to that."

Principal photography took place from 16 August to September 1971.

Peter Sykes was hired after Hammer were impressed by his work on Venom. The movie was based on the life of Franz Mesmer.

Wicking says "there was a sort of snobbery about" the film "which I think is a bad thing." He says Sykes wanted Paul Scofield and then Dirk Bogarde and when neither of them wanted to do it, Hammer felt they could not ask their usual leading men, Peter Cushing and Christopher Lee, and went to Robert Hardy, which Wicking thought was a mistake.

Critical reception 
Time Out called the film "an exotic, Wildean horror story, visually as extravagant and tantalising as a decadent painting" that is "badly let down, though, by some grotesque overacting". The Hammer Story: The Authorised History of Hammer Films wrote of the film: "oblique, ambitious and suffused with an air of primal dread, Demons of the Mind deserved better."

References

Sources

External links 
 

1972 films
Films shot at EMI-Elstree Studios
Hammer Film Productions horror films
1972 horror films
Films directed by Peter Sykes
Films set in country houses
Gothic horror films
EMI Films films
1970s English-language films
1970s British films